Harris Woolfolk Coleman (May 31, 1893 – March 16, 1972) was an American football player, coach, and lawyer. He served as the head football coach at the University of Virginia for one season in 1919, compiling a record of 2–5–2. Coleman was born in 1893 in Stanford, Kentucky.
Coleman later practiced law in Louisville as a partner in the firm Coleman & White. He served as county attorney for Jefferson County, Kentucky from 1927 to 1934. He was also active in the Louisville-Jefferson County Republican organization. He died in 1972.

Head coaching record

References

1893 births
1972 deaths
American football guards
Virginia Cavaliers football coaches
Virginia Cavaliers football players
All-Southern college football players
Kentucky lawyers
Kentucky Republicans
People from Stanford, Kentucky
Coaches of American football from Kentucky
Players of American football from Louisville, Kentucky
Sportspeople from Louisville, Kentucky
20th-century American lawyers